Northsound 2 is an Independent Local radio station broadcasting to Aberdeen and Aberdeenshire on DAB digital radio and online. Owned and operated by Bauer Radio, Northsound 2 forms part of Bauer's Greatest Hits Radio network of classic hit music stations in England, Scotland and Wales, carrying networked programmes originating mainly from Glasgow and Manchester 24 hours a day, featuring local news and traffic bulletins.

The station is due to be rebranded to Greatest Hits Radio North East Scotland on 3 April 2023.

History

Northsound Radio commenced broadcasting at 6am on 27 July 1981 from converted studios in an old schoolhouse on Kings Gate, near Anderson Drive in Aberdeen. Originally, the station was broadcast from 6am to 8pm each day on 1035 kHz (290 metres) and 96.9 FM (VHF). In 1995, the station split its services to become Northsound 1 and Northsound 2. Both stations now also broadcast online, on smartphone applications and DAB (Digital Audio Broadcasting – i.e. Digital Radio).

On 3 June 2013, station owners Bauer Radio announced that Northsound 2 would axe its one remaining local programme, the weekday breakfast show which was presented by John McRuvie, and replace it with a networked show hosted by Robin Galloway from Monday 1 July 2013 across all of Bauer's network of AM stations in Scotland. The station became part of the Bauer City 2 network (since rebranded as Greatest Hits Radio) upon its launch on Monday 5 January 2015.

On Tuesday 3 April 2018, Northsound 2 ceased broadcasting on 1035 AM and became a digital-only station on DAB and online. It is the first commercial radio station in Scotland - and the first of Bauer's local stations - to cease analogue broadcasting in favour of a digital switchover.

Programming
Most of Northsound 2's programming is carried from Greatest Hits Radio's network of locally-branded Scottish stations with some off-peak output also carried from GHR's sister network in England.

Networked programming originates from the studios of Clyde 2 in Clydebank, Forth 2 in Edinburgh, Tay 2 in Dundee and from Greatest Hits Radio's Birmingham, Nottingham, London and Manchester studios. Occasional programming is produced and broadcast from MFR 2 in Inverness, Northsound 2 in Aberdeen and West Sound in Ayrshire and Dumfries and Galloway

News
Northsound 2 broadcasts local news bulletins hourly from 6am to 7pm on weekdays and from 7am to 1pm at weekends. Headlines are broadcast on the half hour during weekday breakfast and drivetime shows, alongside sport and traffic bulletins.

National bulletins from Sky News Radio are carried overnight with bespoke networked Scottish bulletins at weekends, produced from Radio Clyde's newsroom in Clydebank.

See also
Northsound Radio
Northsound 1

References

External links

Bauer Radio
Greatest Hits Radio
Radio stations in Aberdeen
Radio stations established in 1981